The Summit 2, also called the Summit II, is an American powered parachute that was originally designed and manufactured in 1999 by Aircraft Sales and Parts of Vernon, British Columbia and now produced by Summit Aerosports of Yale, Michigan.

Design and development
The aircraft was designed to comply with the US FAR 103 Ultralight Vehicles rules as a two-seat trainer, or as an amateur-built aircraft. It features a parachute-style high-wing, two-seats-in-tandem, tricycle landing gear and a single  Rotax 582 engine in pusher configuration. The  Hirth 2706,  Rotax 503,  Rotax 912 and the  HKS 700E engines are factory options.

The aircraft is built from a combination of 6061-T6 aluminium, 4130 steel and stainless steel tubing. The canopy is attached to the carriage at four points, instead of the more conventional two points, to improve stability. In flight steering is accomplished via rail-mounted sliding foot pedals that actuate the canopy brakes, creating roll and yaw. Steering is via a 2:1 ratio system of pulleys that reduce the force required and increase control authority. The lack of pivoting control bars allows cockpit fairings to be fitted. On the ground the aircraft has lever-controlled nosewheel steering. The aircraft is factory supplied in the form of an assembly kit that requires 20–30 hours to complete.

Specifications (Summit 2)

References

External links

1990s United States ultralight aircraft
Single-engined pusher aircraft
Powered parachutes